

List of Ambassadors

Alon Roth-Snir 2018 - 
Raphael Schutz 2014 - 2018
Liora Herzl 2001 - 2005,
Yudith Hiebner 1983-1987
Hava Hareli (Non-Resident, Oslo) 1978 - 1981
Ambassador David Rivlin (Non-Resident, Oslo) 1975 - 1978
Ambassador Avigdor Dagan (Non-Resident, Oslo) 1969 - 1972
Minister Moshe Bitan (Non-Resident, Stockholm) 1962 - 1964
Minister Chaim Yahil (Non-Resident, Stockholm) 1956 - 1959
Minister Avraham Nissan (Non-Resident, Stockholm) 1950 - 1956

References

Iceland
Israel